James Speakman (born 1888) was an English footballer who played as a defender.

External links
 LFC History profile

1888 births
English footballers
Liverpool F.C. players
Year of death missing
Association football defenders